George "Ginger" Bell (7 May 1912 – 12 May 1999) was an Australian rules footballer who played with Essendon in the Victorian Football League (VFL).

Originally from Horsham, Bell played at Essendon for 10 seasons. Bell was a defender, often used at full-back. He wasn't selected in Essendon's 1942 premiership team, playing just once that year, in what would be his final season.

References

1912 births
Australian rules footballers from Victoria (Australia)
Essendon Football Club players
Horsham Football Club players
1999 deaths